The 1901 University of New Mexico football team was an American football team represented the University of New Mexico as an independent during the 1901 college football season. The team compiled a 0–3–1 record and outscored all opponents by a total of 111 to 34. Joe Napier was the coach and team captain. Prane was a co-captain.

Schedule

References

University of New Mexico
New Mexico Lobos football seasons
College football winless seasons
University of New Mexico football